Patrick Norton (born 1928) is a former Irish politician. He first stood for election at the Kildare by-election on 19 February 1964 but he was not elected. The by-election was caused by the death of his father William Norton, former Tánaiste and Labour Party leader from 1932 to 1960. Patrick Norton was elected to Dáil Éireann as a Labour Party Teachta Dála (TD) for the Kildare constituency at the 1965 general election.

A businessman and property owner, with no previous record of party activism, he strongly opposed Labour's ideological swing to the left in the mid 1960s under Brendan Corish's leadership. After being attacked at the party conference regarding a court case condemning houses that he owned, he left the party in December 1967, insisting it had been captured by ‘a small but vocal group of fellow travellers’.

In February 1969, he joined Fianna Fáil. On joining, he accused Labour of embracing "Cuban socialism". He stood as a Fianna Fáil candidate at the 1969 general election but lost his seat. He was subsequently elected to the 12th Seanad on the Administrative Panel as a Fianna Fáil senator. He also stood as a Fianna Fáil candidate at the 1973 general election for the Dublin South-East constituency but he was not elected.

See also
Families in the Oireachtas

References

1928 births
Living people
Labour Party (Ireland) TDs
Members of the 18th Dáil
Members of the 12th Seanad
Politicians from County Kildare
Fianna Fáil TDs
Independent TDs
Fianna Fáil senators